Dominic Cozzolino (born August 23, 2003) is a Canadian ice sledge hockey player. He was a member of the silver medal-winning Canadian team of Para ice hockey at the 2018 Winter Paralympics. His role was singled out by Gagan Sikand at Parliament. Cozzolino is a resident of Mississauga. His disability was caused by a spinal fracture while playing able-bodied ice hockey.

References

External links 
 
 

1994 births
Living people
Canadian sledge hockey players
Medalists at the 2018 Winter Paralympics
Para ice hockey players at the 2018 Winter Paralympics
Paralympic medalists in sledge hockey
Paralympic silver medalists for Canada
Paralympic sledge hockey players of Canada
Sportspeople from Kitchener, Ontario